Haigia nevadana is a species of ulidiid or picture-winged fly in the genus Haigia of the family Tephritidae.

References

Otitinae